Coleophora juglandella is a moth of the family Coleophoridae. It is found in Canada, including Ontario.

The larvae feed on the leaves of Juglans nigra. They create a spatulate leaf case.

References

juglandella
Moths described in 1946
Moths of North America